Redfield is a historic home located near Oak Level, Halifax County, Virginia. It was built in 1855–1857, and is a two-story, four bay, central hall plan, hipped roofed brick dwelling in the Classical Villa style. The main block is flanked by one-story brick wings.  The front facade features a two-story pavilion with a flat-roof portico supported by square brick piers which flank paired Grecian-Doric columns and set on a stone podium.

It was listed on the National Register of Historic Places in 1978.

References

Houses on the National Register of Historic Places in Virginia
Neoclassical architecture in Virginia
Houses completed in 1857
Houses in Halifax County, Virginia
National Register of Historic Places in Halifax County, Virginia
1857 establishments in Virginia